Crocosmia × crocosmiiflora, montbretia, is a garden hybrid of C. aurea and C. pottsii, first bred in 1880 in France by Victor Lemoine. The basionym of the hybrid is Montbretia crocosmiiflora Lemoine.  In 1932 it was reclassified as C. × crocosmiiflora (Lemoine) N .E.Br., but the common name "montbretia" is still often found in horticultural literature, and is commonly used in the British Isles for orange-flowered cultivars that have naturalised, while "crocosmia" is reserved for less aggressive red-flowered cultivars.

Description
Crocosmia × crocosmiiflora grows to 90 cm high with long sword-shaped leaves, shorter than the flowering stem and arising from the plant base, ribbed and up to 20mm wide. The base is a corm, a swollen underground stem lasting one year. The flowers are up to 5 cm long and coloured deep orange.

Cultivation
In the United States, Crocosmia × crocosmiiflora is considered suitable for planting in hardiness zones 5–9, but in more northerly locations it can be planted in the spring and the corms dug out in the fall. The corms should be planted in a well-drained garden soil in a full sun to partial shade.  The hybrid will set viable seed that can be grown from seed as soon as ripe, but as a hybrid will not breed true.  In Belfast, Northern Ireland it is recorded as well-established in a wide range of locations.

There are over 150 named cultivars within C. × crocosmiiflora including:
'Babylon'  − orange-red with yellow throats
 'George Davidson' − yellow 
 'His Majesty' − flowers large, orange
 'Jackanapes' − flowers orange-red, inner lobes golden yellow
 'Meteor' − orange yellow 
 'Solfatare' − yellow flowers with bronze foliage
 'Star of the East'  − light orange with pale centres

Those marked  have received the Royal Horticultural Society's Award of Garden Merit.

Invasive species
Crocosmia × crocosmiiflora is deemed an invasive plant in the United Kingdom, the Isle of Man and New Zealand, where it is common on roadsides in the northern parts of the West Coast of the South Island. The New Zealand Department of Conservation classes it as an environmental weed.

The California Invasive Plants Council (Cal-IPC) lists Crocosmia × crocosmiiflora as an invasive plant in California, with limited concern / distribution.

It is widely naturalised in England and Scotland especially along the western seaboard from Cornwall north all the way to Sutherland.

Notes

References

External links
 
 Kew Plant List
 IPNI Listing

Iridaceae
Plant nothospecies
Garden plants
Plants described in 1880